Rabbi Etan Mintz is an American rabbi, activist, writer, and the spiritual leader of the historic B'nai Israel Synagogue (Baltimore) of Baltimore. Rabbi Mintz is leading the revitalization of the oldest continually active synagogue in Maryland and one of the oldest standing synagogues in America. Mintz is an active proponent of Jewish inclusivity. He is a nationally sought speaker, writer, and educator. In response to the 2015 Baltimore protests after the shooting of Freddie Gray, Rabbi Mintz led a multiracial, interfaith group of clergy to increase community cooperation in Baltimore. Rabbi Mintz has advocated for strengthening racial relations and has advocated for a more welcoming and inclusive vision of Modern Orthodox Judaism.

Rabbi Mintz has led spiritual disaster response teams in the aftermaths of crisis situations, as well as efforts countering anti-semitism, and preserving Holocaust memory.

Rabbi Mintz received his rabbinical ordination from the Rabbi Isaac Elchanon Rabbinical School at Yeshiva University. He also holds an M.P.A. degree from the Kennedy School at Harvard University and a master's degree in Jewish Philosophy and Mysticism from the Bernard Revel Graduate School of Jewish Studies.

Rabbi Mintz lives in Baltimore with his wife, Dr. Tammy Mintz, and their five children.

References

2015 Baltimore protests
Amid Baltimore strife, one rabbi finds hope
Synagogue looks to create eruv downtown
Members of Baltimore synagogue speak out after finding swastika
http://jewishtimes.com/events/the-hasidic-masters-part-one-with-rabbi-etan-mintz-2016-11-22/
http://www.jns.org/latest-articles/2016/1/12/wedding-traditions-across-the-abrahamic-faiths
National and local reaction to charges in Freddie Gray case
Synagogue looks to create eruv downtown
Hopkins business students put their skills to work in one of Baltimore 's oldest neighborhoods
http://forward.com/opinion/311584/why-i-said-kaddish-for-churchgoers-in-charleston/
Baltimore Jews join Freddie Gray protests – but it's complicated
http://jewishtimes.com/31760/downtown-tribe/news/
https://www.washingtonpost.com/posteverything/wp/2015/05/05/why-a-bunch-of-rabbis-went-to-baltimore-to-protest-and-pray/
http://www.yctorah.org/about/jewish-leadership-advisory-board/
https://www.nytimes.com/2013/04/07/travel/glimmers-of-jewish-glory-days-in-baltimore.html
https://www.cjebaltimore.org/board

American Orthodox rabbis
Living people
Harvard Kennedy School alumni
Modern Orthodox rabbis
Yeshiva University alumni
Year of birth missing (living people)
21st-century American Jews